The Ligue Corse de Football is a federal body of the French Football Federation which was founded in 1922. It is responsible for organising all football competitions in Corsica.

History 
The league is believed to have been created in 1922 in Corte, but there is no official documentation. Plus, some documents suggest the league was created in late 1921.

League 
The LCF, whose headquarters are in Bastia, is one of one two regional leagues in France to not be subdivided into departmental districts. This is due to the fact that they were removed in 1929.

The main competition organised by the league is the Division d'Honneur de Corse which entitles the winner to participate in the Championnat de France Amateur. The league also deals with the early rounds of the Coupe de France and managed the regional women's football.

References 

Football leagues in France
Football in Corsica
Sports leagues established in 1922